The following is a list of the 27 municipalities (comuni) of the Province of Crotone, Calabria, Italy.

List

See also
List of municipalities of Italy

References

Crotone